André Le Gall (1917–1974) was a French stage and film actor.

Selected filmography
Goodbye Leonard (1943)
 Love Around the Clock (1943)
 First on the Rope (1944)
 Fantômas (1946)
 Le bataillon du ciel (1947)
 Passeurs d'or (1948)
 I Like Only You (1949)
 La taverna della libertà (1950)
 The Case of Doctor Galloy (1951)
 Guilty? (1951)
 The Angel of Sin (1952)
 A Mother's Secret (1952)
 Operation Magali (1953)
 Daisy Town (1971)

References

Bibliography
 Crisp, Colin. French Cinema—A Critical Filmography: Volume 2, 1940-1958. Indiana University Press, 2015.

External links

1917 births
1974 deaths
French male film actors
Male actors from Paris